Daisy chain may refer to:

 Daisy chain, a garland created from daisy flowers
 Daisy chain (climbing), a type of strap
 Daisy chain (electrical engineering), a wiring scheme
 Daisy chain (fishing), a type of fishing lure
 Daisy chain (knot), or chain sinnet
 Daisy chain (network topology), for connecting computers
 Daisy chain (sex), a type of group sex
 Daisy chaining DNA, when DNA undergoing PCR amplification becomes tangled 
 Daisy Chain (Record Label), a subsidiary of Almighty Records
 Daisy Chain (Sapphire & Steel), a 2005 audio drama
 The Daisy Chain (California band), an American female band

See also

Daisy (disambiguation)